Stuart Alexander Nash (born August 1967) is a politician from New Zealand. He entered Cabinet in October 2017, with the portfolios of Police, Revenue, Small Business and Fisheries.

Nash is the great-grandson of Sir Walter Nash, 27th Prime Minister of New Zealand in the Second Labour Government from 1957 to 1960.

Professional life
Born in Napier and educated at Napier Boys' High School, Nash holds master's degrees in Law, Forestry Science and Management from the University of Canterbury. Before moving back to his home town of Napier, he was the Director of Strategic Development at Auckland University of Technology.

Political career

Early political career
In  Nash was the Labour candidate for the safe National seat of Epsom, placing third behind Rodney Hide and Richard Worth; having been directed by then-Prime Minister Helen Clark to ask Labour supporters to vote for the National candidate, Richard Worth, in a strategy designed to defeat ACT MP, Rodney Hide. The tactic didn't work, with Hide winning; though at 9,915 Labour received the highest number of party votes in this electorate at any time under the MMP parliamentary system. Placed at number 60 on the party list, Nash failed to get elected.

Election to Parliament on the list
In 2007 Nash contested the Labour Party selection for the Napier seat in the 2008 general election, but lost to Russell Fairbrother, a list MP and the former Napier electorate MP. However Nash was ranked at number 36 on the party list and was subsequently elected to parliament.

After becoming a list MP Nash was appointed Labour's spokesperson for Revenue, and associate spokesperson for Trade and Forestry by Labour leader Phil Goff. On 15 June 2010, Opposition Leader Phil Goff appointed Nash to be portfolio spokesperson for Forestry, a position formerly held by Mita Ririnui. In February 2011 Phil Goff announced his new caucus line up and Nash was ranked 27th, retaining all his portfolio responsibilities.

2011–2014

In the 2011 general election, Nash contested the Napier electorate seat held by National Cabinet Minister Chris Tremain. Nash reduced Tremain's 2008 majority of 9,018 votes by 5,300 votes (the highest reduction achieved against a sitting National electorate MP) but still came second. As well, Nash was ranked 27 on the Labour list, higher than in 2008 but not high enough on the Labour list to return to Parliament as a List MP.

After leaving Parliament, Nash signed on as the chief-of-staff for newly appointed party leader David Shearer. However, Nash resigned after just four months into the job and returned to his home town of Napier, citing the birth of his new child and focusing on winning back the electorate there.

2014–current: return to Parliament
In February 2014, Nash was selected as Labour's candidate for Napier to contest the 2014 general election. National's Tremain had retired and was succeeded by Wayne Walford, and Nash had a majority of 3,850 votes over Walford. The electorate was also contested by Garth McVicar for the Conservative Party, and McVicar's 7,603 votes cut into traditional National Party votes.

Nash was elected as a Cabinet Minister by the Labour Party caucus following Labour's formation of a coalition government with New Zealand First and the Greens. On 26 October, he was appointed as Minister of Police, Revenue, Small Business and Fisheries.

During the 2020 general election, Nash retained his seat in Napier by a final margin of 5,856. On 2 November 2020, Jacinda Ardern announced that Nash would be dropping the Police, Revenue and Fisheries portfolios, and would pick up the Economic and Regional Development, Forestry, and Tourism portfolios, while retaining Small Business.

In mid November 2021, Nash claimed that farming advocacy group Groundswell NZ's website promoted racism and vaccine hesitancy in response to a question by ACT Member of Parliament Mark Cameron. When Cameron reiterated his question, Nash told Cameron to avoid posing with someone holding an anti-vaccination sign at a Groundswell protest. In response to Stuart's remarks, Groundswell co-founder Bryce McKenzie emphasised the group's efforts to combat racism and vaccine hesitancy among its ranks. McKenzie added that the group had accepted the resignation of Groundswell member and Tatua Dairy board of directors member Ross Townshend for posting an offensive image depicting Foreign Minister Nanaia Mahuta as a gang member.

In mid–March 2023, Nash resigned as Minister of Police following revelations he asked the Police Commissioner Andrew Coster to appeal a decision Nash felt was too light, a breach of the expectation that the Government remains neutral in regards to operational Police matters. On 16 March, Nash faced further calls from the opposition National and ACT parties to resign from his remaining portfolios after revelations that the Attorney-General David Parker had reprimanded Nash for making remarks during a 2020 Newstalk ZB interview calling for murder suspect Eli Epiha to be imprisoned for his actions during the shooting of Matthew Hunt. At the time, Epiha was facing trial and had not yet been convicted for murdering Hunt. Nash subsequently admitted to a third incident of misconduct where he contacted the Ministry of Business, Innovation and Employment (MBIE) to advocate for a migrant health professional in Napier in September 2022. In response, Hipkins demoted Nash to the bottom of the Cabinet rankings as a "final warning" but declined to strip him of his remaining cabinet portfolios.

References

External links

 
 Parliamentary webpage

|-

|-

|-

|-

|-

|-

|-

1967 births
Living people
New Zealand people of English descent
New Zealand Labour Party MPs
University of Auckland alumni
University of Canterbury alumni
New Zealand list MPs
Unsuccessful candidates in the 2011 New Zealand general election
Members of the New Zealand House of Representatives
Unsuccessful candidates in the 2005 New Zealand general election
21st-century New Zealand politicians
Candidates in the 2017 New Zealand general election
Members of the Cabinet of New Zealand
Candidates in the 2020 New Zealand general election